In organic chemistry, a sulfonium ion, also known as sulphonium ion or sulfanium ion, is a positively-charged ion (a "cation") featuring three organic substituents attached to sulfur.  These organosulfur compounds have the formula . Together with a negatively-charged counterion, they give sulfonium salts.  They are typically colorless solids that are soluble in organic solvent.

Synthesis
Sulfonium compounds are usually synthesized by the reaction of thioethers with alkyl halides. For example, the reaction of dimethyl sulfide with iodomethane yields trimethylsulfonium iodide:
  +  → 

The reaction proceeds by a nucleophilic substitution mechanism (SN2). Iodide is the leaving group departs. The rate of methylation is faster with more electrophilic methylating agents, such as methyl trifluoromethanesulfonate.

Inversion
Sulfonium ions with three different substituents are chiral owing to their pyramidal structure.  Unlike the isoelectronic oxonium ions (R3O+), chiral sulfonium ions are resolvable into optically stable enantiomers. [Me(Et)SCH2CO2H]+ is the first chiral sulfonium cation to be resolved into enantiomers.  The barrier to inversion ranges from 100 to 130 kJ/mol.

Applications and occurrence

Biochemistry
The sulfonium (more specifically methioninium) species S-adenosylmethionine occurs widely in nature, where it is used as a source of the adenosoyl or methyl radicals.  These radicals participate in the biosynthesis of many compounds.

Other naturally-occurring sulfonium species are S-methylmethionine (methioninium) and the related dimethylsulfoniopropionate (DMSP).

Organic synthesis
Sulfonium salts are precursor to sulfur ylides, which are useful in carbon–carbon bond-forming reactions. In a typical application, a R2S+CH2R′ center is deprotonated to give the ylide R2S+CHR−.

Tris(dimethylamino)sulfonium difluorotrimethylsilicate [((CH3)2N)3S]+[F2Si(CH3)3]− is a popular fluoridation agent.

Some azo dyes are modified with sulfonium groups to give them a positive charge.  The compound triphenylsulfonium triflate is a photoacid, a compound that under light converts to an acid.

See also 
Onium compounds

References

External links 
 IUPAC definition (short pdf)

Cations
 
Sulfur ions